Maberly is a surname. Notable people with the surname include:

Kate Maberly (born 1984), English actress and singer songwriter
Polly Maberly (born 1976), English actress
John Maberly (1777–1845), British entrepreneur, banker and politician
William Leader Maberly (1798–1885), British army officer and politician

External links
 Maberly family website